Giada Bragato (born 14 July 1999) is a Hungarian sprint canoeist.

Career
She competed at the 2021 ICF Canoe Sprint World Championships, winning a bronze medal in the C-2 200 m distance. She competed at the 2022 ICF Canoe Sprint World Championships and won three bronze medals.

Bragato was born to a Hungarian mother and an Italian father.

References

External links

1999 births
Living people
Hungarian female canoeists
ICF Canoe Sprint World Championships medalists in Canadian
20th-century Hungarian women
21st-century Hungarian women